Padiiset's Statue or Pateese's Statue, also described as the Statue of a vizier usurped by Padiiset, is a basalt statue found in 1894 in an unknown location in the Egyptian delta which includes an inscription referring to trade between Canaan and Ancient Egypt during the Third Intermediate Period. It was purchased by Henry Walters in 1928, and is now in the Walters Art Museum.

It is the second – and last – known Egyptian reference to Canaan, coming more than 300 years after the preceding known inscription.

The statue is made of black basalt and measures 30.5 x 10.25 x 11.5 cm, and was created in the Middle Kingdom period to commemorate a government vizier. Scholars believe that a millennium later the original inscription was erased and replaced with inscriptions on the front and back representing "Pa-di-iset, son of Apy" and worshipping the gods Osiris, Horus, and Isis.

The inscriptions read:
Ka of Osiris: Pa-di-iset, the justified, son of Apy. 

The only renowned one, the impartial envoy/commissioner/messenger of/for Canaan of/for Peleset, Pa-di-iset, son of Apy.

References

Bibliography
 Editio princeps: Émile Gaston Chassinat, "Un interprète égyptien pour les pays cananéens". Bulletin de L'Institut Français d'Archéologie Orientale 1, 1901, 98
 

Sculptures of ancient Egypt
History of Palestine (region)